The Royal Danish Academy of Fine Arts has provided education in the arts for more than 250 years, playing its part in the development of the art of Denmark.

History 
The Royal Danish Academy of Portraiture, Sculpture, and Architecture in Copenhagen was inaugurated on 31 March 1754, and given as a gift to the King Frederik V on his 31st birthday.

Its name was changed to the Royal Danish Academy of Painting, Sculpture, and Architecture in 1771. At the same event, Johann Friedrich Struensee introduced a new scheme in the academy to encourage artisan apprentices to take supplementary classes in drawing so as to develop the notion of "good taste". The building boom resulting from the Great Fire of 1795 greatly profited from this initiative.

In 1814 the name was changed again, this time to the Royal Danish Academy of Fine Arts. It is still situated in its original building, the Charlottenborg Palace, located on the Kongens Nytorv in Copenhagen. The School of Architecture has been situated in former naval buildings on Holmen since 1996.

It teaches and conducts research on the subjects of painting, sculpting, architecture, graphics, photography, performance, and video, as well as in the history of those subjects.

The academy is under the administration of the Danish Ministry of Culture.

The School of Architecture, Design and Conservation is separated from Schools of Visual arts and therefore is a different institution(KADK)

Institutions 
 Kunstakademiets Billedkunstskoler, The School of Visual Arts
 Kunstakademiets Arkitektskole, The School of Architecture
 Kunstakademiets Designskole, The School of Design
 Kunstakademiets Konservatorskole, The School of Conservation
 Det Kongelige Akademi for de Skønne Kunster

Awards
 C. F. Hansen Medal
 Thorvaldsen Medal
 Eckersberg Medal
 Thorvald Bindesbøll Medal
 N. L. Høyen Medal

Notable alumni and faculty 
The School of Visual Arts
 Carl Bloch
 C. C. A. Christensen
 Lili Elbe
 Olafur Eliasson
 Andreas Emenius
 Caspar David Friedrich (1794–1798)
 Oluf Hartmann
 Jeppe Hein
 Georg Jensen
 Asger Jorn
 Jane Jin Kaisen
 Karl Kvaran
 Philipp Otto Runge (1799–1801)
 Heidi Maria Schwarck
Nína Sæmundsson
 Bertel Thorvaldsen

The School of Architecture

 Jan Gehl
 Birgit Cold
 Knud Holscher
 Bjarke Ingels
 Victor Isbrand
 Arne Jacobsen
 Finn Juhl
 Kaare Klint
 Henning Larsen
 Alex Popov
 Steen Eiler Rasmussen
 Verner Panton
 Johann Otto von Spreckelsen
 Magnus Steendorff
 Lene Tranberg
 Jørn Utzon
 Kristian von Bengtson
 Martin Nyrop

Directors of the Royal Academy schools

Gallery

See also
 Architecture of Denmark
 Arne Ranslet
 Danish art
 List of Danish painters
 Open access in Denmark

Notes and references

External links
 Det Kongelige Danske Kunstakademi
 Kunstakademiets Arkitektskole
 Det Jyske Kunstakademi
 Det Fynske Kunstakademi
 Top 10' World's best Architecture Universities / Schools 

 
Organizations based in Denmark with royal patronage
Organizations based in Copenhagen
Organizations established in 1754
1754 establishments in Denmark
Danish art

sv:Kunstakademiets Arkitektskole